Events in the year 2021 in Tunisia.

Incumbents
 President: Kais Saied
 Prime Minister: Hichem Mechichi, Najla Bouden
 President of the Assembly of the Representatives by the People: Rached Ghannouchi
Government: Mechichi Cabinet, Bouden Cabinet

Cabinet

This is an incomplete list of the Cabinet announced January 16, 2021.
Ministry of the Interior: Walid Dhabi
Ministry of Health: Hedi Khairi
Ministry of Justice: Youssef Zouaghi
Ministry of Industry, Energy and Mines: Sofien Ben Touns
Ministry of Agriculture: Oussama Kheriji
Ministry of the Environment (Tunisia): Chiheb Ben Ahmed
Ministry of Culture (Tunisia): Youssef bin Ibrahim

Events
Ongoing — COVID-19 pandemic in Tunisia

January to April
January 16 – Prime Minister Hichem Mechichi appoints 12 new ministers.
January 17 – 2021 Tunisian protests: Thousands take to the streets of Tunis and Sousse as protests turn violent in response to economic hardship on the 10th anniversary of the Arab Spring. Protesters shut down oil production in Tataouine.
January 20 – Young people clash with police for the fifth straight night. “Your voice is heard, and your anger is legitimate, and it is my role and the role of the government to work to realize your demands and to make the dream of Tunisia to become true,” Prime Minister Mechichi said in a fruitless attempt to calm things down.
February 6 – Hundreds of protesters backed by the million-member UGTT union defy government orders to rally in Tunis on the eighth anniversary of the assassination of Chokri Belaid.
March 9 – At least 39 migrants from sub-Saharan Africa drowned when their boat capsizes off the Tunisian coast; 165 are rescued.
April 2 – A female suicide bomber kills herself and her baby during counter-terrorism operations in Kasserine Governorate. Two other Islamic extremists were killed in a separate operation.

May to August

July 25 – 2021 Tunisian political crisis

October 

 October 11 – Najla Bouden becomes Prime Minister of Tunisia, making her the first female prime minister both in Tunisia and the Arab world.

Sports

Deaths

5 January – Moncer Rouissi, politician (b. 1940).
22 January – Meherzia Labidi Maïza, 57, politician and translator, member of the Constituent Assembly (2011–2014) and Deputy (since 2014), COVID-19.
28 January – Chedly Ayari, 87, economist and politician, President of the Central Bank of Tunisia (2012–2018), Minister of Finance (1972–1974) and Education (1970–1971), COVID-19.
29 January – Ahmed Achour, 75, composer and conductor.
3 February – Abdelkader Jerbi, film director.
7 February – Moufida Tlatli, 73, film director (The Silences of the Palace, The Season of Men), Minister of Culture (2011).
26 March – Saâdeddine Zmerli, 91, urologist and politician.

References

External links
Tunisian border traders, smugglers struggle to survive amid COVID (Al Jazeera, 24 January 2021)

 
2020s in Tunisia
Years of the 21st century in Tunisia
Tunisia
Tunisia